Evgenia Mikhailovna Lalenkova (née Dmitrieva; born 8 September 1990) is a Russian speed skater.

She participated at the 2019 World Single Distances Speed Skating Championships, winning the bronze medal in the team pursuit.

She is married to speed skater Yevgeny Lalenkov.

World Cup results

Podiums

References

External links

1990 births
Living people
Russian female speed skaters
World Single Distances Speed Skating Championships medalists
Universiade bronze medalists for Russia
Universiade medalists in speed skating
Competitors at the 2013 Winter Universiade
People from Furmanov
Speed skaters at the 2022 Winter Olympics
Olympic speed skaters of Russia
Sportspeople from Ivanovo Oblast
21st-century Russian women